Henry Rousso (born 23 November 1954) is an Egyptian-born French historian specializing in World War II France.

Early life
Henry Rousso was born on 23 November 1954 in Cairo, Egypt to a Jewish family. Forced out of Egypt under anti-Semitic measures instituted by the Nasser regime, and stripped of Egyptian nationality, they fled to France in 1956.

Rousso studied at the École normale supérieure de Saint-Cloud between 1974 and 1979, earning an agrégation in history in 1977. Rousso joined the National Centre for Scientific Research (CNRS) in 1981. The previous year, he participated in the foundation of the Institut d'Histoire du Temps Présent, which he directed between 1994 and 2005.

Rousso taught at the École normale supérieure de Cachan and the Institut d’études politiques de Paris. He has supervised PhD dissertations at Paris Nanterre University from 2001 to 2011, then at Panthon-Sorbonne University from 2011. Rousso currently serves as Director of Research at the CNRS.

Rousso is an editorial board member of several academic journals, including Conserveries mémorielles, Vingtième Siècle, History and Memory, South Central Review, and SegleXX. Revista catalana di Stòria.

He co-directed the collection "Contemporary European History" (Berghahn Books: Oxford/New York), along with Konrad Jarausch.

On February 22, 2017, Rousso was detained by U.S. Customs and Border Protection (CBP) agents for 10 hours on arrival at George Bush Intercontinental Airport in Houston and nearly deported. He had come to give a talk at Texas A&M University and was detained because he was entering the country on a tourist visa and was being paid a stipend for the talk. The Customs and Border Protection agent was unaware that such stipends are allowed for scholars.

Works
Rousso's notable work includes a seminal book on Vichy France entitled The Vichy Syndrome (1987) where he coined a phrase commonly used to describe the era, un passé qui ne passe pas ("a past that doesn't pass".

References

Living people
1954 births
Egyptian emigrants to France
Egyptian Jews
University of Paris alumni
ENS Fontenay-Saint-Cloud-Lyon alumni
Historians of Vichy France
Knights of the Ordre national du Mérite
French male writers
20th-century French historians
21st-century French historians
French people of Egyptian-Jewish descent
Research directors of the French National Centre for Scientific Research